JK Sillamäe Kalev, commonly known as Sillamäe Kalev, or simply as Sillamäe, is an Estonian football club based in Sillamäe. Founded in 1957, Sillamäe Kalev was one of the founding members of the Meistriliiga.

The club competed in the Meistriliiga, the top flight of Estonian football in 2017, but was declared bankrupt in March 2018. Its football academy continued and took over the name, continuing in the II liiga, 4th level in the Estonian football league system.

History
Sillamäe Kalev was founded in 1957 and competed in the Estonian SSR Football Championship. In 1992, the club became one of the founding members of the Meistriliiga. Sillamäe Kalev was relegated after the 1993–94 season.

After a lengthy spell in lower divisions, the club returned to the Meistriliiga for the 2008 season. Sillamäe Kalev finished the 2009 season as runners-up with 76 points behind Levadia and qualified to the 2010–11 UEFA Europa League qualifiers. Sillamäe Kalev faced off Dinamo Minsk in the second qualifying round, losing 1–10 on aggregate. Sillamäe Kalev returned to top three in the 2013 season, when the club placed third. The club finished the 2014 season as runners-up, while Yevgeni Kabaev won the goal scoring title with 36 goals. Sillamäe Kalev reached the 2015–16 Estonian Cup final, but suffered an extra time loss to Flora.

Crest

Honours

Domestic
 Meistriliiga
 Runners-up (2): 2009, 2014
 Third place (1): 2013

 Esiliiga
 Third place (1): 2007

 Estonian Cup
 Runners-up (1): 2015–16

Players

First-team squad

Reserves and academy

Personnel

Managerial history

Statistics

League and Cup

Europe

References

External links

 Official website
Team at Estonian Football Association

 
Football clubs in Estonia
Meistriliiga clubs
Association football clubs established in 1957
JK Sillamae Kalev